Leonard Bernstein's Symphony No. 1 Jeremiah was composed in 1942. Jeremiah is a programmatic work, following the Biblical story of the prophet Jeremiah. The third movement uses texts from the Book of Lamentations in the Hebrew Bible, sung by a mezzo-soprano. The work won the New York Music Critics' Circle Award for the best American work of 1944.

Instrumentation
The symphony is written for 2 flutes, piccolo, 2 oboes, English horn, E-flat clarinet doubling bass clarinet, 2 clarinets, 2 bassoons, contrabassoon, 4 horns, 3 trumpets, 3 trombones, tuba, timpani, snare drum, bass drum, cymbals, triangle, wood block, maracas, piano, mezzo-soprano, and strings.

Movements
The symphony is in three movements:
"Prophecy"
"Profanation"
"Lamentation"

Hebrew text

 
 

 

()

Transliteration

Eicha yashva vadad ha-ir rabati am hay’ta k’almana, rabati vagoyim sarati bam’dinot hay’ta lamas.
Bacho tivkeh balaila v’dim’ata al leḥeya; ein la m’naḥem mikol ohaveha, kol re’eha bag’du hayu lah l’oy’vim.
Galta Y’huda me'oni, umerov avodah, hi yashva vagoyim, lo matsa mano-aḥ; kol rod’feha hisiguha ben hamitsarim.

Ḥet ḥata Y’rushalayim

(Eicha yashva vadad ha-ir ...k’almana.)

Na-u ivrim baḥutsot, n’go-alu badam, b’lo yuchlu yig’u bilvushehem.
Suru tame kar’u lamo, suru, suru, al tiga-u...

Lama lanetsaḥ tishkaḥenu...
Lanetsaḥ... taazvenu...

Hashivenu Adonai eleḥa

English translation
CHAPTER 1.1–3
How doth the city sit solitary,
That was full of people!
How is she become as a widow?
She that was great among the nations.
And princess among the provinces.
How is she become tributary!

She weepeth sore in the night,
And her tears are on her cheeks;
She hath none to comfort her
Among all her lovers;
All her friends have dealt treacherously with her,
They are become her enemies.

Judah is gone into exile because of affliction.
And because of great servitude;
she dwelleth among the nations,
she findeth no rest.
all her pursuers overtook her
Within the narrow passes.

CHAPTER 1.8
Jerusalem hath grievously sinned...
How doth the city sit solitary
...a widow.

CHAPTER 4.14–15
They wander as blind men in the streets,
they are polluted with blood,
so that men cannot
touch their garments.

Depart, ye unclean! they cried unto them,
Depart, depart! touch us not...

CHAPTER 5.20–21
Wherefore dost thou forget us forever,
and forsake us so long time?...

Turn thou us unto thee, o lord...

Premiere
The work was premiered on January 28, 1944, at the Syria Mosque in Pittsburgh with the composer conducting the Pittsburgh Symphony Orchestra. The soloist was Jennie Tourel. It was premiered in New York City on March 29, 1944, at Carnegie Hall, again with Tourel as soloist.

Recordings
Bernstein first recorded the symphony in February 1945 with the Saint Louis Symphony Orchestra and soloist Nan Merriman for RCA Victor. He re-recorded it in stereo for CBS Records in 1962 with Tourel and the New York Philharmonic. A live concert with the Israel Philharmonic and soloist Christa Ludwig at the 1977 Berlin Festival was recorded and released as DVD. It also formed the basis for Bernstein's third recording, released in 1978 on Deutsche Grammophon.

It went unrecorded by anyone else until after the composer's death. It has since taken up by several conductors, and recordings now include those by Leonard Slatkin (twice), James Judd, Marin Alsop, Gustavo Dudamel and Antonio Pappano. The "Lamentation" movement has also been recorded as a standalone work. A transcription of the "Profanation" movement exists for wind band, completed by Frank Bencriscutto.

References

Compositions by Leonard Bernstein
Bernstein 1
1942 compositions
Jewish music